Judith Rascoe (born April 17, 1941) is an American screenwriter known for films like Havana, Who'll Stop the Rain, and Road Movie.

She attended Stanford University, spent a year as a Fulbright scholar at the University of Bristol, studied at Harvard for a time, and soon after began publishing short stories.

She later worked as a journalist and as a teacher of fiction at Yale before turning to screenwriting almost by accident. Independent director Joe Strick came across one of her stories in The Atlantic and asked her if she'd like to write a script. That offer turned into her 1973 debut, Road Movie.

In 1973, she also published a book of short stories called Yours, and Mine.

Selected filmography 

 Havana (1990)
 Eat a Bowl of Tea (1989)
 Endless Love (1981)
 Who'll Stop the Rain (1978)
 A Portrait of the Artist as a Young Man (1977)
 Lifespan (1975)
 Road Movie (1973)

References 

American women screenwriters
Stanford University alumni
Harvard University alumni
1941 births
Living people
21st-century American women